Matthew Robert Bonner (born April 5, 1980), also known as the Red Rocket or Red Mamba, is an American former professional basketball player. Bonner played college basketball for the University of Florida before being selected by the Chicago Bulls with the 45th overall pick in the 2003 NBA draft. During his career Bonner played for the Toronto Raptors and the San Antonio Spurs with whom he won two NBA championships.

Early life
Born in Concord, New Hampshire, Bonner attended Concord High School, where he helped lead them to three state championships. Bonner was also the Valedictorian of his graduating class.

College career
Bonner accepted an athletic scholarship to attend the University of Florida, where he played for coach Billy Donovan's Florida Gators men's basketball team from 1999 to 2003.  In his four seasons, he amassed 1,570 points, 778 rebounds and 165 three-point field goals.  As a senior in 2003, he was a first-team All-Southeastern Conference (SEC) selection and an Associated Press honorable mention All-American.

Bonner graduated with a bachelor's degree, with high honors, in business administration and a 3.96 grade point average (GPA). He won Academic All-American of the Year for the sport of basketball in both 2002 and 2003.

Professional career

Italy (2003–2004)
Bonner was selected with the 45th overall pick in the 2003 NBA draft by the Chicago Bulls but was then traded to the Toronto Raptors. The Raptors did not have a roster spot available at the time and asked Bonner to play overseas and hone his skills with a verbal promise to make the team the following season.

Bonner signed with Sicilia Messina of the Italian league in Messina, Sicily. Sicilia filed for bankruptcy in the middle of the season and stopped paying its players. Many players left the team but Bonner continued to play and finished the year averaging 19.2 points and 9.3 rebounds.

Toronto Raptors (2004–2006)
In September 2004, Bonner signed a one-year deal with the Toronto Raptors. On December 15, 2004, Bonner was ejected during a game against the Minnesota Timberwolves after attempting to block a Kevin Garnett shot attempt, with Raptors fans giving him a standing ovation, chanting his name and high-fiving him on his way out. In 2004–05, he played in all 82 regular season games and averaged 7.2 points. He remains the only Raptors rookie to play all 82 games in a season.

In August 2005, Bonner re-signed with the Raptors on a two-year deal.

San Antonio Spurs (2006–2017)
On June 21, 2006, Bonner was traded with Eric Williams and a second round draft pick to the San Antonio Spurs for Rasho Nesterović and cash considerations. In his first season with the Spurs, he averaged 4.9 points in just 11.7 minutes per game, both of which were career lows for Bonner at that time. The team went on to win the NBA championship that season.

In July 2007, Bonner re-signed with the Spurs on a three-year deal. On December 11, 2007, in a loss to the Golden State Warriors, Bonner recorded season-highs of 25 points and 17 rebounds.

On December 7, 2009, Bonner scored a career high 28 points and grabbed 8 rebounds in a 104–101 loss to the Utah Jazz.

In July 2010, Bonner again re-signed with the Spurs on a multi-year deal. He went on to lead the NBA in three-point field goal percentage for 2010–11 after he shot 45.7%.

In 2011, Bonner starred in Fundamentals of the Game with Coach B, a comedy web series hosted on the Spurs' official website.

After a social media campaign from his brother Luke, Bonner participated in the 2013 NBA Three-Point Shootout during All-Star Weekend. He recorded a score of 19 in the first round to knock out Ryan Anderson (18) and Stephen Curry (17) and advanced to the final where he lost 20–23 to Kyrie Irving. Later that year, Bonner and the Spurs reached the NBA Finals where they lost to the Miami Heat in seven games.

On June 15, 2014, Bonner won his second NBA championship after the Spurs defeated the Miami Heat 4–1 in the 2014 NBA Finals. On July 21, 2014, Bonner re-signed with the Spurs,

On July 15, 2015, Bonner again re-signed with the Spurs. Bonner's final NBA game was played on April 13th, 2016 in a 96 - 91 win over the Dallas Mavericks where he recorded 6 points,1 rebound, 1 assist and 1 block.

He announced his retirement on January 6, 2017. On January 12, 2017, the Spurs jokingly "retired" Bonner's iconic flannel shirt in a locker room ceremony.

NBA career statistics

Regular season 

|-
| align="left" | 
| align="left" | Toronto
| 82 || 0 || 18.9 || .533 || .424 || .789 || 3.5 || .6 || .5 || .2 || 7.2
|-
| align="left" | 
| align="left" | Toronto
| 78 || 6 || 21.9 || .448 || .420 || .829 || 3.6 || .7 || .6 || .4 || 7.5
|-
| style="text-align:left;background:#afe6ba;"| †
| style="text-align:left;"| San Antonio
| 56 || 0 || 11.7 || .447 || .383 || .711 || 2.8 || .4 || .3 || .2 || 4.9
|-
| align="left" | 
| align="left" | San Antonio
| 68 || 3 || 12.5 || .416 || .336 || .864 || 2.8 || .5 || .2 || .3 || 4.8
|-
| align="left" | 
| align="left" | San Antonio
| 81 || 67 || 23.8 || .496 || .440 || .739 || 4.8 || 1.0 || .6 || .3 || 8.2
|-
| align="left" | 
| align="left" | San Antonio
| 65 || 8 || 17.9 || .446 || .390 || .729 || 3.3 || 1.0 || .5 || .4 || 7.0
|-
| align="left" | 
| align="left" | San Antonio
| 66 || 1 || 21.7 || .464 || style="background:#cfecec;"|.457* || .744 || 3.6 || .9 || .4 || .3 || 7.3
|-
| align="left" | 
| align="left" | San Antonio
| 65 || 2 || 20.4 || .440 || .420 || .762 || 3.3 || .9 || .2 || .3 || 6.6
|-
| align="left" | 
| align="left" | San Antonio
| 68 || 4 || 13.4 || .487 || .442 || .733 || 1.9 || .5 || .3 || .3 || 4.2
|-
| style="text-align:left;background:#afe6ba;"| †
| style="text-align:left;"| San Antonio
| 61 || 0 || 11.3 || .445 || .429 || .750 || 2.1 || .5 || .2 || .2 || 3.2
|-
| style="text-align:left;" | 
| style="text-align:left;" | San Antonio
| 72 || 19 || 13.0 || .409 || .365 || .811 || 1.6 || .7 || .1 || .2 || 3.7
|-
| style="text-align:left;"| 
| style="text-align:left;"| San Antonio
| 30 || 2 || 6.9 || .509 || .441 || .750 || .9 || .3 || .2 || .0 || 2.5 
|- class="sortbottom"
| style="text-align:center;" colspan="2" | Career
| 792 || 112 || 16.9 || .464 || .414 || .780 || 3.0 || .7 || .4 || .3 || 5.8

Playoffs 

|-
| style="text-align:left;background:#afe6ba;"| 2007†
| style="text-align:left;"| San Antonio
| 9 || 0 || 2.8 || .286 || .250 || 1.000 || .3 || .0 || .2 || .0 || .8
|-
| align="left" | 2008
| align="left" | San Antonio
| 2 || 0 || 4.5 || .667 || .000 || .000 || 1.0 || 1.0 || .0 || .0 || 2.0
|-
| align="left" | 2009
| align="left" | San Antonio
| 5 || 5 || 20.0 || .217 || .231 || 1.000 || 3.2 || .0 || .6 || .4 || 3.0
|-
| align="left" | 2010
| align="left" | San Antonio
| 10 || 0 || 17.3 || .432 || .370 || 1.000 || 3.2 || .4 || .1 || .3 || 5.0
|-
| align="left" | 2011
| align="left" | San Antonio
| 6 || 0 || 20.5 || .480 || .333 || .800 || 3.2 || .3 || .2 || .2 || 6.3
|-
| align="left" | 2012
| align="left" | San Antonio
| 13 || 0 || 12.7 || .313 || .348 || .600 || 1.9 || .7 || .2 || .3 || 2.4
|-
| align="left" | 2013
| align="left" | San Antonio
| 20 || 1 || 13.4 || .475 || .469 || .833 || 2.0 || .3 || .3 || .3 || 4.1
|-
| style="text-align:left;background:#afe6ba;"| 2014†
| style="text-align:left;"| San Antonio
| 22 || 2 || 6.1 || .476 || .333 || .750 || .7 || .5 || .1 || .0 || 1.3
|- 
| align="left" | 2015
| align="left" | San Antonio
| 7 || 0 || 5.1 || .200 || .222 || .000 || .9 || .1 || .1 || .1 || .9
|-
| style="text-align:center;" colspan="2" | Career
| 94 || 8 || 11.0 || .402 || .355 || .811 || 1.7 || .4 || .2 || .2 || 2.8

Awards and achievements
2013–14 NBA champion
2006–07 NBA champion
2010–11 NBA three-point field-goal percentage leader
2002–03 Honorable Mention All-American
2001–02 Honorable Mention All-American
2002–03 Academic All-American of the Year
2001–02 Academic All-American of the Year
2002–03 All-SEC First Team
2001–02 All-SEC Second Team
2000–01 All-SEC Third Team
2002–03 SEC three-point field-goal percentage leader
2002–03 All-SEC Academic
2001–02 All-SEC Academic
2000–01 All-SEC Academic
1998–99 NHIAA Champions – Concord HS
1997–98 NHIAA Champions – Concord HS
1996–97 NHIAA Champions – Concord HS

Post-NBA career
After retiring from professional basketball, Bonner joined San Antonio Spurs TV Broadcast as a studio analyst.

Personal life

Bonner and his wife Nadia have one daughter, Evangeline-Vesper Lynne Bonner (born June 21, 2009) and one son, August Bonner (born August 27, 2012).

He has a younger brother, Luke, who was also a professional basketball player. Luke served as Matt's best man at his wedding.

Bonner applied for Canadian citizenship in February 2009, but did not qualify, due to the amount of time he spent outside the country.

Bonner is a sandwich enthusiast. He has a blog titled "The Sandwich Hunter: The Quest for the Hoagie Grail" in which he documents his search for the "world's best sandwich." He is also a fan of the sport of curling, due to discovering it on Canadian television during his tenure with the Toronto Raptors.

During his tenure with the Toronto Raptors, he received the nickname the "Red Rocket" for his red hair and constant use of the public transit in Toronto, the Toronto Transit Commission, whose slogan is "Ride the Rocket."

Kobe Bryant coined Bonner's other nickname, the "Red Mamba", on Twitter while live-tweeting in 2013 during a televised replay of his 81-point game against Bonner and the Toronto Raptors.

After his contract with New Balance expired, Bonner signed a basketball shoe deal with Adidas in January 2014.

Bonner and his brother Luke run a nonprofit organization called the Rock On Foundation, in which they look to support community involvement in arts and athletics.

In March 2016, Bonner was featured on the season-premiere episode of FYI's Tiny House Nation, where he and his wife Nadia had a 276-sq.-foot house custom-built.

See also

 List of Florida Gators in the NBA
 List of University of Florida alumni

References

External links

1980 births
Living people
American expatriate basketball people in Canada
American expatriate basketball people in Italy
American men's basketball players
Basketball players from New Hampshire
Centers (basketball)
Chicago Bulls draft picks
Florida Gators men's basketball players
Parade High School All-Americans (boys' basketball)
Power forwards (basketball)
Sportspeople from Concord, New Hampshire
San Antonio Spurs players
Toronto Raptors players